The Episcopal Diocese of Indianapolis, formerly known as the Episcopal Diocese of Indiana, is a diocese in Province V (for the Midwest region) of the Episcopal Church. It encompasses the southern two-thirds of the state of Indiana. Its see is in Indianapolis, Indiana, at Christ Church Cathedral. According to the diocesan newsletter, the diocese has 10,137 communicants in 49 parishes. The current bishop is Jennifer Baskerville-Burrows, the first African-American woman to serve as diocesan bishop in the Episcopal Church and the first woman to succeed another woman as a diocesan bishop in the Episcopal Church; Catherine Waynick served as bishop of the diocese from 1997 to 2017.

History
Like many of the Episcopal dioceses in the Midwest, the history of the Diocese of Indianapolis begins with the consecration of Jackson Kemper as Missionary Bishop of the Northwest in 1835. At the time, Indiana was a wilderness and the first Anglican meetings were often held in remote Methodist and Presbyterian churches, as well as courthouses, stores, schoolhouses and private homes. Kemper founded several Indiana churches; the oldest one still standing is Saint John's Church in Crawfordsville, Indiana.

The Episcopal Diocese of Indiana was formed in 1849 with the consecration of George Upfold as bishop of Indiana. The first cathedral was Saint John's Church in Lafayette, Indiana, because it was the only parish with a parsonage at the time. Within a few years, Upfold moved the episcopal residence to Indianapolis, where Saint Paul's Church, Grace Church, and All Saints' Church served as the cathedral before it was moved to Christ Church in 1954. Christ Church was consecrated as the pro-cathedral for the diocese on October 10, 1954.  

In 1898 the Episcopal Diocese of Indiana was divided to create the Episcopal Diocese of Indianapolis, covering the southern two-thirds of the state, and the Episcopal Diocese of Northern Indiana, covering the northern one-third.

Churches in the Diocese

The Episcopal Diocese of Indianapolis is made up of 48 parishes across the lower two-thirds of the state of Indiana:

 All Saints Episcopal Church, Indianapolis, Indiana
 Chapel of the Good Shepherd, West Lafayette, Indiana
 Christ Church Cathedral, Indianapolis, Indiana
 Christ Church, Madison, Indiana
 Church of the Nativity, Indianapolis, Indiana
 Episcopal Campus Ministry at Indiana University, Bloomington, Indiana
 Good Samaritan Episcopal Church, Fishers, Indiana
 Peace Episcopal Church, Rockport, Indiana
 St. Alban's Episcopal Church, Indianapolis, Indiana
 St. Andrew's Episcopal Church, Greencastle, Indiana
 St. Augustine Episcopal Church, Danville, Indiana
 St. Christopher's Episcopal Church, Carmel, Indiana
 St. David's Episcopal Church, Bean Blossom, Indiana
 St. Francis-in-the-Fields Church, Zionsville, Indiana
 St. George's Episcopal Church, West Terre Haute, Indiana
 St. James Episcopal Church, New Castle, Indiana
 St. James' Episcopal Church, Vincennes, Indiana
 St. John's Episcopal Church, Bedford, Indiana
 St. John's Episcopal Church, Crawfordsville, Indiana
 St. John's Episcopal Church, Lafayette, Indiana
 St. John's Episcopal Church, Washington, Indiana
 St. Luke's Episcopal Church, Cannelton, Indiana
 St. Luke's Episcopal Church, Shelbyville, Indiana
 St. Mark's Episcopal Church, Plainfield, Indiana
 St. Mary's Episcopal Church, Martinsville, Indiana
 St. Matthew's Episcopal Church, Indianapolis, Indiana
 St. Michael's Episcopal Church, Noblesville, Indiana
 St. Paul's Episcopal Church, Columbus, Indiana
 St. Paul's Episcopal Church, Evansville, Indiana
 St. Paul's Episcopal Church, Indianapolis, Indiana
 St. Paul's Episcopal Church, Jeffersonville, Indiana
 St. Paul's Episcopal Church, New Albany, Indiana
 St. Paul's Episcopal Church, Richmond, Indiana
 St. Peter's Episcopal Church, Lebanon, Indiana
 St. Philip's Episcopal Church, Indianapolis, Indiana
 St. Stephen's Episcopal Church, New Harmony, Indiana
 St. Stephen's Episcopal Church, Terre Haute, Indiana
 St. Stephen's Episcopal Church, Elwood, Indiana
 St. Thomas Episcopal Church, Franklin, Indiana
 St. Timothy Episcopal Church, Indianapolis, Indiana
 Trinity Episcopal Church, Anderson, Indiana
 Trinity Episcopal Church, Bloomington, Indiana
 Trinity Episcopal Church, Indianapolis, Indiana
 Trinity Episcopal Church, Lawrenceburg, Indiana

Bishops of the Diocese
The bishops of the diocese in order are:
 Jackson Kemper, I Indiana, (1838–1849)
 George Upfold, II Indiana, (1849–1872)
 Joseph Cruickshank Talbot, III Indiana, (1872–1883)
 David Buel Knickerbacker, IV Indiana, (1883–1894)
 John Hazen White, V Indiana, (1895–1899) Knickerbacker worked with the Episcopal General Convention to split the Diocese in two to better serve the growing congregation. The 1898 Episcopal General Convention agreed and split the Episcopal Diocese of Indianapolis from the Episcopal Diocese of Northern Indiana. White went on to head the new diocese from 1899-1925, while Joseph Marshall Francis ascended to become the sixth Bishop of Indiana.
 Joseph Marshall Francis, VI Indianapolis, (1899–1939) The diocese was renamed from Indiana to Indianapolis on September 1, 1902.
 Richard A. Kirchhoffer VII Indianapolis, (1939–1959)
 John Pares Craine, VIII Indianapolis, (1959–1977)
 Edward Witker Jones, IX Indianapolis, (1978–1997)
 Catherine Maples Waynick, X Indianapolis, (1997-2017)
 Jennifer Baskerville-Burrows, XI Indianapolis (2017-present)

See also
 List of Episcopal bishops

Resources
 
 Harvey, Jane C. History of Saint John's Church 1837-1887. from the website of St. John's Church, Lafayette.
 
 Lilly, Eli, History of the Little Church on the Circle, Christ Church Parish, Indianapolis, 1837-1955 Indianapolis: Rector, Wardens, etc. of Christ  Episcopal Church, 1957.

References

External links
Diocesan website
Journal of the Proceedings of the Annual Convention of the Protestant Episcopal Church in the Diocese of Indiana from 1840-1898
Journal of Annual Convention, Diocese of Indianapolis

Anglican dioceses established in the 19th century
Religion in Indianapolis
Indianapolis
Diocese of Indianapolis
Religious organizations established in 1898
Province 5 of the Episcopal Church (United States)